István Turu (25 September 1962 – 15 February 2021) was a Hungarian boxer. He competed in the men's lightweight event at the 1988 Summer Olympics. He died from COVID-19 during the pandemic in Hungary.

References

External links
 

1962 births
2021 deaths
Hungarian male boxers
Olympic boxers of Hungary
Boxers at the 1988 Summer Olympics
People from Törökszentmiklós
Lightweight boxers
Deaths from the COVID-19 pandemic in Hungary
Place of death missing
Sportspeople from Jász-Nagykun-Szolnok County